The Patna High Court is the High Court of the state of Bihar. It was established on 3 February 1916 and later affiliated under the Government of India Act 1915.

The court is based in Patna, the administrative capital of the state of Bihar, India.

.

History of the court

A proclamation for setting up the court was issued by the governor-general of India on 22 March 1912. The foundation-stone of the High Court Building was laid on 1 December 1913 by Viceroy and Governor-General of India Sir Charles Hardinge of Penshurst. Work commenced on 1 March 1916. The Patna High Court building on its completion was formally opened by the same viceroy on 3 February 1916. Edward Maynard Des Champs Chamier was the first chief justice of the court. 

In 1948, the Patna High Court exercised jurisdiction over the territories of the Province of Bihar & Orissa until 26 July 1948, when a separate high court was constituted for Orissa. The Patna High Court opened a circuit bench at Ranchi in 1972. In 1976, the circuit bench of the Patna High Court at Ranchi became a permanent bench. In 2000, the circuit bench of the Patna High Court at Ranchi became the Jharkhand High Court in November 2000, under the Bihar Reorganisation Act, 2000.

Starting 18 April 2015, the Patna High Court planned a year-long centenary celebration of 100 years of establishment, and the occasion was inaugurated by the president of India, Shri Pranab Mukherjee, and chaired by the governor of Bihar Shri, Keshari Nath Tripathi; the chief justice of India, H. L. Dattu; and the chief justice of the Patna High Court, L. Narasimha Reddy.

Prominent judges of the Patna High Court
 Hon. Ms. Justice  Rekha Doshit was the chief justice of the Patna High Court and the first woman to hold this office.
 Hon. Sir Edward Maynard Des Champs Chamier is the first chief justice of the Patna High Court.
 Hon. Pandit Lakshami Kant Jha was the first Indian chief justice of the Patna High Court after independence.
 Hon. Mrs. Justice Indu Prabha Singh, the first lady judge of the Patna High Court, holds the distinction of being the first woman judge to hold court at the Patna High Court and its Ranchi Bench.
 Hon. Mrs. Justice Gyan Sudha Misra, the second lady judge of the Patna High Court, is the first woman judge of the Supreme Court of India from Bihar.
The high court has given two chief justices of India.
 Hon. Mr. Justice Bhuvneshwar Prasad Sinha, the 6th chief justice of India.
Hon. Mr. Justice Lalit Mohan Sharma, the 24th chief justice of India.

Judges 
The following have served as judges of the court.

Former chief justices 
The following have served as chief justices of the court.

References

External links

Jurisdiction and Seats of Indian High Courts
Judge strength in High Courts increased

Government of Patna
Buildings and structures in Patna
Government of Bihar
1916 establishments in British India
Judiciary of India
Courts and tribunals established in 1916